Mohammad Zeeshan (born 15 April 2006 in Faisalabad, Punjab) is a Pakistani cricketer who plays for Central Punjab.

Early life
Born in the Chak 58 JB Lillan village of the Faisalabad District, Zeeshan is the youngest of three brothers. He  developed an interest in cricket due to his elder brother and considers Shoaib Akhtar and Curtly Ambrose to be his role models.

Domestic career
Zeeshan made his List A debut for Central Punjab against Northern during the 2021-22 Pakistan Cup on 16 March 2022. Zeeshan played for the Pakistan under-19 cricket team during the 2021 ACC Under-19 Asia Cup. Zeeshan was also named as a travelling reserve for Pakistan in the 2022 ICC Under-19 Cricket World Cup.

International career
In December 2022, Zeeshan was added to the Pakistani Test squad along with Arafat Minhas and Basit Ali by the interim selection committee.

References

External links 
 
 Mohammad Zeeshan at Pakistan Cricket Board

2006 births
Living people
Punjabi people
Pakistani cricketers
Central Punjab cricketers
People from Faisalabad
Cricketers from Faisalabad